Bud Haidet is the former athletic director at the University of Wisconsin–Milwaukee, a position he held from 1990 until his retirement in 2009.

Haidet's most significant contribution to Milwaukee athletics was moving the program to NCAA Division I upon his hiring.  He oversaw the department as the Panthers men's basketball team made the NCAA Division I men's basketball tournament for the first time in 2003, and two more times, in 2005 and 2006, including a Sweet Sixteen appearance in 2005.

References

Year of birth missing (living people)
Living people
Milwaukee Panthers athletic directors